Maharashtri language may refer to:
 Maharashtri Prakrit, the Prakrit form once spoken in Maharashtra
 Marathi language, the predominantly spoken language of Maharashtra